The Nishan-e Aqdas (Imperial Order or Most Sacred Order) was an Imperial Iranian Order founded in 1870 by the Qajar Shah of Iran Nassereddin. There were three classes, with two different styles for Iranians (Sardar) and foreigners (Nishan). The Order was dissolved upon the collapse of the Qajar dynasty.

The three classes were:
 Aqdas (Most Sacred, 1st class)
 Qods (Very Sacred, 2nd class)
 Moqaddas (Sacred, 3rd class)

Recipients 

 Ahmad Shah Qajar
 Amanullah Khan
 Edward VII
 Khazʽal Ibn Jabir
 Kamran Mirza Nayeb es-Saltaneh
 Malek Mansur Mirza Shoa O-Saltaneh
 Mass'oud Mirza Zell-e Soltan
 Officers
 Reza Khan Mirpanj, Sardar-e-Aqdas
 Sheikh Khaz'al Khan, Sardar-e-Aqdas

See also
Aryamehr
Order of the Lion and the Sun
 Order of Aftab
 Order of Zolfaghar

External links
 Iranian Orders & Decorations

Civil awards and decorations of Iran